The Sir Frank Whittle Medal is awarded annually by the Royal Academy of Engineering to an engineer,
normally resident in the United Kingdom, for outstanding and sustained achievement which has contributed to the well-being of the nation. The field of activity in which the medal is awarded changes annually.

Named after Sir Frank Whittle, the award was instituted in 2001. 

Previous winners:

References

Engineering awards
Awards established in 2001
British science and technology awards
Royal Academy of Engineering